{{Infobox former subdivision
|native_name =  
|conventional_long_name = Baoni State
|common_name = Baoni
|nation = British India
|subdivision = Princely State
|era =
|year_start = 1784
|date_start = 
|event_start= 
|year_end = 1948
|date_end = 
|event_end= Indian independence
|event1 = 
|date_event1 = 
|p1 = Maratha Empire
|s1 = India
|flag_p1 = Flag of the Maratha Empire.svg
|flag_s1 = Flag of India.svg
|image_flag = Drapeau Baoni.png
|image_coat = Baoni State CoA.png
|image_map = Beri-Bijna-Tori Fatehpur map.jpg
|image_map_caption =Baoni State (Kadaura) in the Imperial Gazetteer of India
|motto = '"Al hukumu lilah wāl mulk Lilāh"  (Rulership and dominion belongs to God) 
|stat_area1 =313
|stat_year1 = 1901
|stat_pop1 = 19,780 
|footnotes = The Imperial Gazetteer of India}}

Baoni State was a princely state in India during the British Raj. It was a small sanad state, the only Muslim-ruled one in Bundelkhand Agency. Its ruler was granted the right to an 11-gun salute. The Baoni royal family claim to be descendants of the Asaf Jahi dynasty of Hyderabad, tracing its origins to Abu Bakr, the first Islamic caliph.

Baoni was located in the Betwa-Yamuna doab'', Uttar Pradesh, with Kadaura as its seat of government. The state was bounded on the north by the district of Cawnpore, in the west by the district of Jalaun and to the south and east by the district of Hamirpur of the United Provinces —as well as a little part in the south-east by Beri State. Baoni had a population of 19,780 inhabitants in 1901, of whom 87% were Hindu and 12% Muslim.

See also
Kadaura
Nizam of Hyderabad
List of Sunni Muslim dynasties
Mahseer in heraldry

References

External links

Pictures of Baoni State

Princely states of Uttar Pradesh
Muslim princely states of India
Jalaun district
1784 establishments in India
1948 disestablishments in India